The adjusted current yield is a financial term used in reference to bonds and other fixed-interest securities. It is closely related to the concept of current yield.

The adjusted current yield is given by the current yield with addition of 

Here Face value is the face value of the bond, and Clean price is the clean price of the bond (i.e. present value of the bond with accrued interest subtracted).

Formula for adjusted current yield 

In total the adjusted current yield is given by

Mathematical finance
Bond valuation
Fixed income analysis